Jüri Lossmann ( – 1 May 1984) was an Estonian long distance runner. He finished second in the marathon at the 1920 Summer Olympics in Antwerp, at 2:32:48.6, trailing Hannes Kolehmainen by 13 seconds, but beating the third-placed Valerio Arri by almost 4 minutes. At the 1924 Summer Olympics in Paris he was the flag bearer for Estonia and finished tenth in the marathon.

Biography
Lossmann started as a football player for Merkur club before changing to athletics. He was wounded in World War I, but recovered and in 1916 won a marathon race in Tallinn and the Russian Championships in the 5000 m. In 1923 he won the international marathon in Gothenburg, Sweden, and in 1928, he ran the first leg of the Trans-America Run. Next year he set an Estonian record in one-hour running and competed in the Antwerpen marathon.

Besides running, Lossmann worked for the Estonian Chocolate Factory Kawe in 1922–36, and in the 1930s trained Estonian long-distance runners, but without much success. In 1942–44 he served as a sports administrator in Estonia. During World War II he fled to Sweden just before the arrival of the Soviet troops. Lossmann was earlier trained as a jeweler, and in Sweden he worked as a gold- and silversmith. In 1964 he made a silver cup for Gustaf VI Adolf of Sweden to express the gratitude of the Estonian community in Sweden.

References

External links 
 
 
 
 
 

1891 births
1984 deaths
People from Türi Parish
People from the Governorate of Livonia
Estonian male long-distance runners
Olympic athletes of Estonia
Olympic silver medalists for Estonia
Athletes (track and field) at the 1920 Summer Olympics
Athletes (track and field) at the 1924 Summer Olympics
Estonian male marathon runners
Estonian World War II refugees
Estonian emigrants to Sweden
Medalists at the 1920 Summer Olympics
Olympic silver medalists in athletics (track and field)